The Toth alias Soky family (initially Tott alias Soky) was a Hungarian noble family ennobled in 1647 by King Ferdinand III.

Origins

On June 11, 1647, Paulus Tott, his brother Joannes, and his son Andreas were ennobled in Pozsony castle by king Ferdinand III. This act has been published on December 3rd of 1648 in Nytra county.

See also
List of titled noble families in the Kingdom of Hungary

Notes

Hungarian noble families